Gambling in Nigeria is not well regulated. Although there is a gambling law in place, many illegal casinos operate in the country. The legal land-based casinos are located in the two largest cities. The biggest casino is The Federal Palace Hotel in Lagos. Nigerian law focuses on activities to reduce money laundering and illegal gambling.

Gambling law
Gambling in Nigeria is regulated by the National Lottery Regulatory Commission and, for a long time, given the strong presence of the Catholic church in Nigerian civil society, it was discouraged and seen as an anti-social phenomenon. The lottery was legalized with the National Lottery Act, 2005 and gambling is defined by Chapter 22 of the Criminal Code Act enacted in 1990. Thanks to these new regulations, gambling has entered people's ordinary lives, with a focus on betting on the most popular sports in Nigeria.

Several years back, many people in Nigeria perceived gambling as sinful. However, things are beginning to change now. With most of the country's citizens being very religious, the current generation of Nigerian youths is generally more liberal and open to placing bets online.

Technological development and exposure to social media have contributed to this shift toward more liberal thought in Nigeria. Sports betting, in particular, is no longer an activity that individuals undertake behind closed doors and is now acceptable in society.

The law splits the games into two categories: The legal and illegal games. The legal games are lottery, land-based casino, and sports betting. Roulette, dice games, and non-skilled card games are illegal. The law regulates slot machine activity and only licensed operators can provide slot machine gambling. Money laundering activity is covered by  the Money Laundering (Prohibition) Act, 2011.

Online gambling
Sports betting has been popular in Nigeria for several decades, but online sports betting wasn't that popular until the late 2000s. Today, though, Nigeria is home to more than 40 sports betting sites, with estimates indicating that close to 60 million Nigerians actively participate in sports betting. That's close to a third of Nigeria's population. 

Online gambling in Nigeria is regulated by the Nigerian Lottery Commission. All bookmakers are required to obtain a license from the gaming commission before operating in Nigeria. Nigerian law does not mention online space and there is no restriction for the people to reach local or foreign gambling sites. Although Internet space is not mentioned exactly in the law, the companies are obliged to follow the regulations and laws as it is for the land-based casinos. All types of online games are available except those that are illegal.

Since the advent of online sports betting, Nigeria is now the second-largest online gambling market in the African continent, with projections indicating that soon, Nigeria will overtake South Africa and take the number position as the largest gambling market in Africa.

Online Gambling Companies
Nigeria is one of the most competitive markets in gambling in Africa. The size of the population and internet exposure of the residents creates the right conditions for online gambling companies to operate in. Some of the legal bookmakers available online in Nigeria include Bet9ja, 1960bet, Nairabet, Betfair, 9jaPredict, Betway, BetNigeria and others.

Unlike several decades back, when mobile phones were not prevalent, such isn't the case today. According to a recent report, Nigeria is home to more than 100 million internet users and about 169 cell phone customers.

It is no surprise that as the number of mobile phone and internet users in the nation has climbed, so has the rate of sports betting. We may now place bets quite quickly and affordably, whether from the convenience of our homes or while traveling.

Nigeria's internet connectivity is impressive. Internet user penetration in Nigeria slightly increased between 2018 and 2022, from around 26% to 38%. With increased internet penetration and accessibility to affordable smartphones, sports betting in Nigeria is undoubtedly growing.

Gambling age
The gambling age is defined by the law. People below the age of 18 cannot legally gamble.

Payment gateways
There is no obstacle when depositing money to foreign or local bookies, although betting limits exist as defined by respective individual bookmakers. Users deposit money using bank cards, e-wallets such as Skrill or Neteller, and most recently USSD services. There is no legal restriction or service blocking.

References